Thinopyrum is a genus of Eurasian and African plants in the grass family.

Species
The following species are recognised in the genus Thinopyrum:
Thinopyrum acutum (DC.) Banfi - Europe, Turkey
Thinopyrum bessarabicum (Savul. & Rayss) Á.Löve - Black Sea and Aegean regions
Thinopyrum corsicum (Hack.) Banfi - Corsica
Thinopyrum curvifolium (Lange) D.R.Dewey - Spain
Thinopyrum distichum (Thunb.) Á.Löve - Cape Province; naturalized in Western Australia
Thinopyrum × duvalii (Loret) Banfi - France, Italy, Turkey
Thinopyrum elongatum (Host) D.R.Dewey - Mediterranean, Middle East
Thinopyrum flaccidifolium (Boiss. & Heldr.) Moustakas - Turkey, Greece, Albania, Sicily
Thinopyrum gentryi (Melderis) D.R.Dewey - Turkey, Iran
Thinopyrum intermedium (Host) Barkworth & D.R.Dewey - central and southern Europe; central and south-western Asia; naturalized in North America
Thinopyrum junceiforme (Á.Löve & D.Löve) Á.Löve - northern and central Europe, Selvagens, Morocco; naturalised in Australia
Thinopyrum junceum (L.) Á.Löve - Mediterranean, Canary Islands, Madeira, Caucasus; naturalized in Australia, New Zealand, Oregon, California, Falkland Islands
Thinopyrum obtusiflorum (DC.) Banfi - Europe and Caucasus
Thinopyrum podperae (Nábelek) D.R.Dewey - Turkey, Iraq, Iran
Thinopyrum turcicum (P.E.McGuire) B.R.Baum & D.A.Johnson - Turkey, Iraq, Iran
Thinopyrum varnense (Velen.) B.R.Baum & D.A.Johnson - south-eastern Europe

References

External links
 Grassbase - The World Online Grass Flora

 
Poaceae genera